State Highway 5 (SH 5), one of New Zealand's eight national highways, runs from State Highway 1 at Tīrau, in the south Waikato, to State Highway 2, close to the Hawkes Bay coast at Bay View, 10 km north of Napier. It is the second shortest of the national highways.

SH 5 is a two-lane single carriageway, except for a two-kilometre section of dual carriageway in Rotorua, and has at-grade intersections and property accesses in both rural and urban areas. The NZ Transport Agency classifies SH 5 as a regional strategic highway, except for the section concurrent with SH 1 around Taupō, where it is classified as a national strategic road.

Route

SH 5 leaves SH 1 at a roundabout just south-east of the town of Tīrau in the south Waikato and heads east, crossing over the Mamaku Ranges to Lake Rotorua. The highway skirts the southwestern edge of the lake, entering the city of Rotorua and continuing south through the Rotorua-Taupō thermal area to the upper reaches of the Waikato River. SH 5 joins SH 1 at Wairakei, a few kilometres north of the town of Taupō, and runs concurrently with it on the East Taupo Arterial road, bypassing the town to the east.

SH 5 diverges from SH1 at a roundabout just east of Taupō and heads southeast on the Napier-Taupō road. It runs just south of the prominent Mount Tauhara then passes through the small settlement of Opepe, which is at the intersection of two major pre-European walking tracks (Taupō-Napier and Urewera-Tokaanu). It then runs through the pine plantations of the Kaingaroa Forest, on the broad Kaingaroa plains that were formed from the ash from the Taupō eruption of ~230 CE, passing Iwitahi. Exiting the forest it crosses the headwaters of the Rangitaiki River.

Leaving the Volcanic Plateau, it follows the Waipunga River, the first section being the Runanga Deviation, which opened in 1972, replacing the last long stretch of narrow unsealed road. The highway then crosses the Mohaka River, the site of one of New Zealand's major road tragedies in the 1990s, when a housebus plunged from the bridge. The Mohaka river is a popular spot for whitewater rafting and trout fishing.

The highway next ascends to cross the 708-metre Titiokura Saddle, the site of a proposed electricity generating wind farm, before passing through Te Pohue, a former coaching stop for travellers heading inland from Napier. A few kilometres  further on is an unsealed road leading to Trellinoe Park, one of New Zealand's largest private gardens. From here, the road descends into the Esk River valley, a fertile area with vineyards and orchards, as well as one of the country's few lavender farms, which is open to the public. SH 5 ends at the Napier–Wairoa section of SH 2, close to the Hawkes Bay coast and the mouth of the Esk River, at the northern end of the Bay View district, 10 km north of Napier.

Route changes
Prior to the 1931 Hawke's Bay earthquake the final part of the route was over Hill Road between Eskdale and Bay View, with the road from Taupō meeting the Wairoa road at Bay View, three kilometres south of the present junction. The earthquake raised the land and altered the course of the Esk River; the course of the highway was changed to follow suit.

SH 5 once ran through central Rotorua. The old route left the current route at the Lake Road traffic lights, and followed the route of Lake Road, Ranolf Street, Amohau Street, Fenton Street, and Hemo Road, where it re-merges with the current section. Today, it follows Old Taupo Road, which bypasses the central city to the west.

The Taupo Bypass (East Taupo Arterial) opened in 2010, shifting the concurrent SH 1 and SH 5 from the township and lakeside to the eastern outskirts of Taupō.

Major junctions
Distances are measured from north to south.

See also
List of New Zealand state highways
List of roads and highways, for notable or famous roads worldwide

References

External links
 New Zealand Transport Agency

5